The 2016 United States House of Representatives elections were held November 8, 2016, to elect representatives from all 435 congressional districts across each of the 50 U.S. states. The six non-voting delegates from the District of Columbia and the inhabited U.S. territories were also elected. Numerous federal, state, and local elections, including the 2016 presidential election and the 2016 Senate elections, were also held on this date.

Election ratings

Latest published ratings for competitive seats 
Several sites and individuals publish ratings of competitive seats. The seats listed below were considered competitive (not "safe" or "solid") by at least one of the rating groups. These ratings are based upon factors such as the strength of the incumbent (if the incumbent is running for re-election), the strength of the candidates, and the partisan history of the district (the Cook Partisan Voting Index is one example of this metric). Each rating describes the likelihood of a given outcome in the election.

Most election ratings use:
 Tossup: no advantage
 Tilt (sometimes used): slight advantage
 Lean: clear advantage
 Likely: strong, but not certain advantage
 Safe: outcome is nearly certain

<div style="overflow-x:auto;>
{| class="wikitable sortable" style="text-align:center"
|- valign=bottom
! District
! CPVI
! Incumbent
! Firstelected
! 2014result
! CookNov 7,2016
! DKENov 7,2016
! Roth.Nov 3,2016
! Sab.Nov 7,2016
! RCPOct 31,2016
! Winner
|-
! 
| style="background:#f66" | 
|  | Don Young (R)
| 1973
|  | 
| 
| 
| 
| 
| 
|  | Don Young (R)

|-
! 
| style="background:#fcc" | 
|  | Ann Kirkpatrick (D)
| 2012
|  | 
| 
| 
| 
| 
| 
|  | Tom O'Halleran (D)

|-
! 
| style="background:#fcc" | 
|  | Martha McSally (R)
| 2014
|  | 
| 
| 
| 
| 
| 
|  | Martha McSally (R)

|-
! 
| 
|  | Ami Bera (D)
| 2012
|  | 
| 
| 
| 
| 
| 
|  | Ami Bera (D)
|-
! 
| style="background:#fcc" | 
|  | Jeff Denham (R)
| 2010
|  | 
| 
| 
| 
| 
| 
|  | Jeff Denham (R)

|-
! 
| style="background:#ccf" | 
|  | David Valadao (R)
| 2012
|  | 
| 
| 
| 
| 
| 
|  | David Valadao (R)
|-
! 
| style="background:#ccf" | 
|  | Lois Capps (D)
| 1998
|  | 
| 
| 
| 
| 
| 
|  | Salud Carbajal (D)

|-
! 
| style="background:#fcc" | 
|  | Steve Knight (R)
| 2014
|  | 
| 
| 
| 
| 
| 
|  | Steve Knight (R)

|-
! 
| style="background:#fcc" | 
|  | Darrell Issa (R)
| 2000
|  | 
| 
| 
| 
| 
| 
|  | Darrell Issa (R)

|-
! 
| style="background:#ccf" | 
|  | Scott Peters (D)
| 2012
|  | 
| 
| 
| 
| 
| 
|  | Scott Peters (D)
|-
! 
| style="background:#f99" | 
|  | Scott Tipton (R)
| 2010
|  | 
| 
| 
| 
| 
| 
|  | Scott Tipton (R)

|-
! 
| style="background:#ccf" | 
|  | Mike Coffman (R)
| 2008
|  | 
| 
| 
| 
| 
| 
|  | Mike Coffman (R)

|-
! 
| style="background:#f66" | 
|  | Gwen Graham (D)
| 2014
|  | 
| 
| 
| 
| 
| 
|  | Neal Dunn (R)

|-
! 
| style="background:#fcc" | 
|  | John Mica (R)
| 1992
|  | 
| 
| 
| 
| 
| 
|  | Stephanie Murphy (D)

|-
! 
| style="background:#99f" | 
|  | Daniel Webster (R)
| 2010
|  | 
| 
| 
| 
| 
| 
|  | Val Demings (D)

|-
! 
| style="background:#ccf" | 
|  | David Jolly (R)
| 2014
|  | 
| 
| 
| 
| 
| 
|  | Charlie Crist (D)

|-
! 
| style="background:#fcc" | 
|  | Patrick Murphy (D)
| 2012
|  | 
| 
| 
| 
| 
| 
|  | Brian Mast (R)

|-
! 
| 
|  | Carlos Curbelo (R)
| 2014
|  | 
| 
| 
| 
| 
| 
|  | Carlos Curbelo (R)

|-
! 
| style="background:#fcc" | 
|  | Ileana Ros-Lehtinen (R)
| 1989
|  | 
| 
| 
| 
| 
| 
|  | Ileana Ros-Lehtinen (R)

|-
! 
| style="background:#99f" | 
|  | Robert Dold (R)
| 2014
|  | 
| 
| 
| 
| 
| 
|  | Brad Schneider (D)

|-
! 
| 
|  | Mike Bost (R)
| 2014
|  | 
| 
| 
| 
| 
| 
|  | Mike Bost (R)

|-
! 
| style="background:#f99" | 
|  | Jackie Walorski (R)
| 2012
|  | 
| 
| 
| 
| 
| 
|  | Jackie Walorski (R)

|-
! 
| style="background:#f99" | 
|  | Todd Young (R)
| 2010
|  | 
| 
| 
| 
| 
| 
|  | Trey Hollingsworth (R)

|-
! 
| style="background:#99f" | 
|  | Rod Blum (R)
| 2014
|  | 
| 
| 
| 
| 
| 
|  | Rod Blum (R)

|-
! 
| 
|  | David Young (R)
| 2014
|  | 
| 
| 
| 
| 
| 
|  | David Young (R)

|-
! 
| style="background:#f99" | 
|  | Kevin Yoder (R)
| 2010
|  | 
| 
| 
| 
| 
| 
|  | Kevin Yoder (R)

|-
! 
| style="background:#ccf" | 
|  | Bruce Poliquin (R)
| 2014
|  | 
| 
| 
| 
| 
| 
|  | Bruce Poliquin (R)

|-
! 
| style="background:#ccf" | 
|  | John K. Delaney (D)
| 2012
|  | 
| 
| 
| 
| 
| 
|  | John K. Delaney (D)

|-
! 
| style="background:#f99" | 
|  | Dan Benishek (R)
| 2010
|  | 
| 
| 
| 
| 
| 
|  | Jack Bergman (R)

|-
! 
| style="background:#fcc" | 
|  | Fred Upton (R)
| 1986
|  | 
| 
| 
| 
| 
| 
|  | Fred Upton (R)

|-
! 
| style="background:#fcc" | 
|  | Tim Walberg (R)
| 2010
|  | 
| 
| 
| 
| 
| 
|  | Tim Walberg (R)

|-
! 
| style="background:#fcc" | 
|  | Mike Bishop (R)
| 2014
|  | 
| 
| 
| 
| 
| 
|  | Mike Bishop (R)
|-
! 
| style="background:#fcc" | 
|  | John Kline (R)
| 2002
|  | 
| 
| 
| 
| 
| 
|  | Jason Lewis (R)

|-
! 
| style="background:#fcc" | 
|  | Erik Paulsen (R)
| 2008
|  | 
| 
| 
| 
| 
| 
|  | Erik Paulsen (R)

|-
! 
| style="background:#ccf" | 
|  | Rick Nolan (D)
| 2012
|  | 
| 
| 
| 
| 
| 
|  | Rick Nolan (D)

|-
! 
| style="background:#f99" | 
|  | Ryan Zinke (R)
| 2014
|  | 
| 
| 
| 
| 
| 
|  | Ryan Zinke (R)

|-
! 
| style="background:#fcc" | 
|  | Brad Ashford (D)
| 2014
|  | 
| 
| 
| 
| 
| 
|  | Don Bacon (R)

|-
! 
| 
|  | Joe Heck (R)
| 2010
|  | 
| 
| 
| 
| 
| 
|  | Jacky Rosen (D)

|-
! 
| style="background:#ccf" | 
|  | Cresent Hardy (R)
| 2014
|  | 
| 
| 
| 
| 
| 
|  | Ruben Kihuen (D)

|-
! 
| style="background:#fcc" | 
|  | Frank Guinta (R)
| 2014
|  | 
| 
| 
| 
| 
| 
|  | Carol Shea Porter (D)

|-
! 
| style="background:#fcc" | 
|  | Scott Garrett (R)
| 2002
|  | 
| 
| 
| 
| 
| 
|  | Josh Gottheimer (D)

|-
! 
| style="background:#fcc" | 
|  | Lee Zeldin (R)
| 2014
|  | 
| 
| 
| 
| 
| 
|  | Lee Zeldin (R)

|-
! 
| 
|  | Steve Israel (D)
| 2000
|  | 
| 
| 
| 
| 
| 
|  | Thomas Suozzi (D)

|-
! 
| style="background:#ccf" | 
|  | Chris Gibson (R)
| 2010
|  | 
| 
| 
| 
| 
| 
|  | John Faso (R)

|-
! 
| 
|  | Elise Stefanik (R)
| 2014
|  | 
| 
| 
| 
| 
| 
|  | Elise Stefanik (R)
|-
! 
| style="background:#fcc" | 
|  | Richard L. Hanna (R)
| 2010
|  | 
| 
| 
| 
| 
| 
|  | Claudia Tenney (R)

|-
! 
| style="background:#fcc" | 
|  | Tom Reed (R)
| 2010
|  | 
| 
| 
| 
| 
| 
|  | Tom Reed (R)

|-
! 
| style="background:#99f" | 
|  | John Katko (R)
| 2014
|  | 
| 
| 
| 
| 
| 
|  | John Katko (R)

|-
! 
| style="background:#99f" | 
|  | Louise Slaughter (D)
| 1986
|  | 
| 
| 
| 
| 
| 
|  | Louise Slaughter (D)

|-
! 
| style="background:#fcc" | 
|  | Ryan Costello (R)
| 2014
|  | 
| 
| 
| 
| 
| 
|  | Ryan Costello (R)

|-
! 
| style="background:#fcc" | 
|  | Mike Fitzpatrick (R)
| 2010
|  | 
| 
| 
| 
| 
| 
|  | Brian Fitzpatrick (R)

|-
! 
| style="background:#fcc" | 
|  | Joe Pitts (R)
| 1996
|  | 
| 
| 
| 
| 
| 
|  | Lloyd Smucker (R)

|-
! 
| style="background:#fcc" | 
|  | Will Hurd (R)
| 2014
|  | 
| 
| 
| 
| 
| 
|  | Will Hurd (R)

|-
! 
| style="background:#f66" | 
|  | Mia Love (R)
| 2014
|  | 
| 
| 
| 
| 
| 
|  | Mia Love (R)

|-
! 
| style="background:#99f" | 
|  | Randy Forbes (R)
| 2001
|  | 
| 
| 
| 
| 
| 
|  | Donald McEachin (D)

|-
! 
| style="background:#f99" | 
|  | Robert Hurt (R)
| 2010
|  | 
| 
| 
| 
| 
| 
|  | Thomas Garrett Jr. (R)

|-
! 
| style="background:#fcc" | 
|  | Barbara Comstock (R)
| 2014
|  | 
| 
| 
| 
| 
| 
|  | Barbara Comstock (R)

|-
! 
| style="background:#fcc" | 
|  | Reid Ribble (R)
| 2010
|  | 
| 
| 
| 
| 
| 
|  | Mike Gallagher (R)

|- valign=top
! District
! CPVI
! Incumbent
! Firstelected
! 2014
! Cook
! DKE
! Roth.
! Sab.
! RCP
! Winner

Generic ballot polls 

The following is a list of generic party ballot polls conducted in advance of the 2018 House of Representatives elections.

References 

House